The Karachi Inter-School Sports League (better known as KISSL) is a Pakistani sports organisation which pitches the top private and international schools in the city, against each other in sporting tournaments and events played in league based competitions. Only students from Grades 8 to 11 are allowed to participate (both British and American systems). Sports include: cricket, football, basketball, throw ball, volleyball and athletics. A KISSL tournament usually consists of 6 to 8 schools and one chosen venue for the entire tournament, although this may vary depending on the sport being played.

Members
The following is the list of schools that are or were once members of KISSL

 Frobels Education Center
 Bay View Academy
 Clifton Grammar School
 Karachi Grammar School
 Lecole for Advanced Studies 
 Lahore Grammar School
 The CAS School, Karachi
 Defence American School
 Karachi American School
 The International School
 Indus Academy
 Bay View High School Karachi
 The City School (Pakistan)
 Foundation Public School
 Avicenna School
 Beaconhouse School System
 St Patrick's High School, Karachi
 Convent of Jesus and Mary (Karachi)
 Habib Public School
 St Michael's Convent School
 Washington International School, Karachi
 Reflections school
 Education Bay School

See also
SAISA

References

Sport in Karachi